Deep Water may refer to:

Arts and entertainment

TV and film
 Deep Water (2006 film), documentary
 Deep Water (TV series), a 2016 Australian drama series
 Deep Water (2019 series), a 2019 British TV series starring Anna Friel
 "Deep Water" (Deadwood), an episode of the TV series Deadwood
 Deep Water (2022 film), 2022 erotic thriller starring Ben Affleck

Literature
 Deep Water (Buffy novel)
 Deep Water (Corris novel)
 Deep Water (Highsmith novel)

Music
 Deep Water, a song by American Authors
 "Deep Water", a song by Richard Clapton

Places
 Deep Water, West Virginia
 Deep Water Bay, Hong Kong
 North Atlantic Deep Water

Other uses
 Operation Deep Water, 1957 NATO naval exercise

See also
 
 Deepwater (disambiguation)
 Deep Waters (disambiguation)